Beaufortia schaueri, commonly known as pink bottlebrush or pink beaufortia, is a species of flowering plant in the myrtle family, Myrtaceae and is endemic to the southwest of Western Australia. It is a small, rounded shrub with small, crowded, linear leaves and profuse, spherical heads of pink flowers conspicuously displayed on the ends of the branches in spring.

Description
The leaves are arranged in alternating pairs (decussate) so that they make four rows along the stems.

The flowers are bright pink to mauve and are arranged in almost spherical heads on the ends of branches which continue to grow after flowering. The flowers have 5 sepals, 5 petals and 5 bundles of stamens. There are usually 5 stamens in a bundle and they are joined for about half their length. Flowering occurs from September to December and is followed by fruits which are woody capsules.

Taxonomy
The specific epithet (schaueri) honours Schauer.

Distribution and habitat
Beaufortia schaueri occurs mainly between the Albany and Israelite Bay districts in the Avon Wheatbelt, Coolgardie, Esperance Plains, Jarrah Forest and Mallee bioregions of south-western Western Australia. It usually grows in sandy soils or those derived from laterite on plains and slopes.

Conservation
Beaufortia schaueri is classified as "not threatened" by the Western Australian government Department of Parks and Wildlife.

References

schaueri
Plants described in 1843
Endemic flora of Western Australia
Taxa named by Johannes Conrad Schauer